Paraphaula is a monotypic beetle genus in the family Cerambycidae described by Ernst Fuchs in 1963. Its only species, Paraphaula porosa, was described by the same author in the same year.

References

Aerenicini
Beetles described in 1963
Monotypic beetle genera